The first election to West Glamorgan County Council and was held in April 1973. It was followed by the 1977 election.

The new authority came into effect from 1 April 1974 following the division of the former Glamorgan County Council into three new authorities.

Candidates

A feature of the election was that the new authority replaced both the existing Glamorgan County Council and the Swansea County Borough Council. In addition, the number of borough and district councils within the new county was reduced to four, namely Swansea City Council, Afan Borough Council, Lliw Valley Borough Council and Neath Borough Council. In many cases members of the former authorities found themselves competing for a reduced number of seats.   

The Labour Party fielded candidates in every ward. A significant proportion of seats were contested by the Conservative Party and Plaid Cymru with fewer candidates fielded by the Liberal Party.

In the Port Talbot area, Lord Heycock was returned unopposed but other Labour candidates faced opposition from Ratepayers and Tenant Association candidates. At Cwmavon, Alderman Mel John, serving mayor of the borough, contested the seat as a Progressive Labour candidate having failed to gain the official nomination.

Outcome
Labour won a decisive victory, winning support across the new county. 

In the Neath area, Labour won eleven of the thirteen seats. The only successful candidates from other parties were Martin Thomas (Independent) at Coedffranc, who served on the former Glamorgan County Council and Huw Evans (Plaid Cymru), at Dulais Higher and Crynant. Evans was the prospective Plaid Cymru parliamentary candidate for the Neath constituency.

Labour also won most of the seats in the Port Talbot area but suffered some defeats at the hands of Ratepayer candidates. At Cwmavon, a sitting member of Glamorgan County Council was defeated by Mel John, who had failed to win the party nomination.

Results
o indicates sitting councillor on Glamorgan County Council or Swansea City Council prior to 1973 election

 indicates sitting alderman on Glamorgan County Council or Swansea City Council prior to 1973 election

Ward Results

Aberavon East and West (three seats)

Aberavon North (one seat)

Aberavon South (one seat)

Brynmelyn (two seats)

Castle (two seats)

Cwmafan (one seat)

Fforest Fach (two seats)

Ffynone (two seats)

Glyncorrwg (two seats)

Gower No.1 (one seat)

Gower No.2 (one seat)

Gower No.3 (one seat)

Landore (two seats)

Llansamlet (two seats)

Llwchwr No.1 (one seat)

Llwchwr No.2 (two seats)

Llwchwr No.3 (two seats)

Margam Central (one seat)

Margam North (one seat)

Margam West (one seat)

Morriston (two seats)

Mumbles (two seats)

Neath No.1, South and Briton Ferry (four seats)

Neath No.2, North, Pontrhydyfen and Tonmawr (two seats)

Neath Rural (six seats)

Neath Rural No.5 (one seat)

Penderry (three seats)

Pontardawe No.1 (one seat)

Pontardawe No.2 (two seats)

Pontardawe No.3 (three seats)

St Helens (two seats)

Sketty (two seats)

St Johns (two seats)

St Thomas (two seats)

Townhill (two seats)

Victoria (two seats)

References

West Glamorgan
West Glamorgan County Council elections